The Wright State Raiders men's basketball is the men's college basketball team that represents Wright State University in Fairborn, Ohio. The school's team currently competes in the Horizon League at the NCAA Division I level. The Raiders won their only national championship in 1983 as an NCAA Division II school.  They have made a total of four NCAA Division I men's basketball tournament appearances. The Raiders play their home games at the Nutter Center and are led by head coach Scott Nagy.

History
Wright State first sponsored men's basketball in 1970 under the direction of Coach John Ross. Players from the first team included Doug Meeks (Captain), Mark Beilinski, Jerry Butcher, Mark Donahue, Jerry Hecht, John Hildebrand, Chuck Horton, Jim Schellhase, Doug Taylor, Jim Thacker. Mike Zink. Paul Brown, and Gary Webb. Jim Thacker was named the MVP and Chuck Horton, Mark Donahue and John Hildebrand took the foul shooting honors. In 1983, Wright State won the Division II NCAA tournament. Wright State moved to Division I in 1987, and have made NCAA Tournament appearances in 1993, 2007, 2018, and 2022.

Ralph Underhill era (1978–1996)
Ralph Underhill was the most successful coach in Wright State history, with a career total of 356 wins, including leading the team to an NCAA Division II National Championship in the 1982–83 season.

In 1999–2000 Israel Sheinfeld playing for the Raiders led the Midwestern Collegiate Conference in field goal percentage, at .543, and in rebounds per game, at 7.7. He was named to the 2000 All-MCC first team. In 2000–2001 he led the conference in two-point field goal percentage, at .595.

Paul Biancardi era (2003–2005)
On April 8, 2003 Wright State announced that Paul Biancardi would be the new head coach. Before coaching Wright State, Biancardi was an assistant at St. Louis, Boston College and Ohio State where he coached under Jim O'Brien. Recognized nationally, Biancardi was named the No. 1 assistant coach in the country by Hoop Scoop Online. In his first season as coach, Wright State finished with a 14–14 record and finished 5th in the Horizon League Standings with a 10–6 conference record and lost to Loyola (IL) in the first round of the conference tournament. In the 2004–2005 season Wright State would finish with a 15–15 while finishing 6th in the conference standings with an 8–8 record. During the Horizon League tournament the Raiders would beat Butler in the first round but lost to Detroit in the second round. In 2005–2006, Wright State's final record was 13–15, with an 8–8 conference record they would finish 7th in the standings. The Raiders would once again have an early exit from the Horizon League tournament, losing to UIC in the first round. Despite never having a winning season in the three seasons that Biancardi coached at Wright State, it was his recruiting classes that would set the Raiders up for success in the future. Wright State and Biancardi agreed to part after the NCAA barred him from recruiting for violating rules while he was an assistant at Ohio State. Biancardi's final record at Wright State was 42–44.

Brad Brownell era (2006–2009)
Brad Brownell left his position with UNC-Wilmington to take over the head coaching duties at Wright State beginning in the 2006–2007 basketball season. In his first season, Wright State was the regular season Horizon League Champion, going 23–10 overall, and 13–3 in conference play. Their 3 losses were at Youngstown State, at Butler, and at Milwaukee. In an impressive season, Wright State only lost one home game all season, that was a 3-point loss to Bowling Green. In the Horizon League Championship game, Wright State edged Butler 60–55 at the Nutter Center, and secured an automatic bid in the NCAA tournament. They eventually earned a 14 seed, and lost in the first round to the Pittsburgh Panthers.

The next three seasons were not as successful for Brownell as his first. Wright State finished 3rd, 3rd, and 2nd respectfully over the 2007, 2008, and 2009 seasons. However, Brad did lead Wright State to 20-win seasons in each of his four years with the program. After the conclusion of the 2009–2010 season, Brad Brownell left Wright State to take the head coaching job at Clemson University.

Brownell finished his coaching at Wright State officially 84–45 and 49–21 in conference play in 4 completed seasons. More impressively, Brownell finished 58–10 in home contests over his 4-year tenure.

Billy Donlon era (2010–2016)
Billy Donlon took over the Wright State Men's Basketball program in 2010 after the announcement that Brad Brownell would be leaving for Clemson. In the 2012–2013 season, after being projected to finish last in the league, Wright State finished 3rd in the Horizon League, and earned a first round bye in the Horizon League tournament. Wright State would beat Youngstown State in the second round of the tournament to advance to the conference semi-finals where they would play the defending Horizon League tournament champion Detroit. Miles Dixon hit a baseline jumper from behind the backboard as time expired, lifting Wright State into the Horizon League tournament championship game for the first time since the 2009–2010 season. The team went on to lose to Valparaiso in the Horizon League Championship game by 6 points. Wright State was invited to the College Basketball Invitational where they would make it to the semi-finals before losing to eventual tournament champion Tulsa. Billy Donlon also earned the Horizon League Coach of the Year award for Wright State's performance in the 2012–2013 season.

Over his six seasons he accumulated an overall record 109–94 vs DI and non DI competition.

Scott Nagy era (2016–present)
After the firing of Billy Donlon after the 2015–2016 season, Wright State hired then South Dakota State University head coach Scott Nagy to head their program. He is the highest paid coach in Raider history with an annual salary of $500k. In Nagy's first season the Raiders went 20–12 and 11–7 in league. The Raiders lost to NKU in the 4/5 match-up in the Horizon League Tournament. The Raiders chose not to participate in postseason play.

In his second season, Nagy's Raiders finished second in the Horizon League regular season (even though they swept #1 seed NKU) with a conference record of 14–4. The Raiders won the Horizon League Tournament and clinched their first NCAA tournament berth since 2007.  

His Raiders teams have continued to set the standard in the Horizon league reeling off 20 win seasons and returning to the NCAA tournament in 2022.

Retired numbers

Wright State has retired one jersey number in its history.

Facilities
The Wright State Raiders currently play their home games at the Ervin J. Nutter Center. Ervin J. Nutter, donated $1.5 million to Wright State University in 1986. Funds from both the state of Ohio and the university contributed an additional $8 million to construction efforts which began in 1988. Completed in 1990, Wright State would host the first event on December 1 where they would defeat Tennessee State 88–66.

Coaches 
The Raiders have had 8 coaches in their 48 years as a program. Current head coach Scott Nagy was hired in 2016. Billy Donlon was the head coach from 2010–2016 after Brad Brownell was announced as the new Clemson head coach. Brownell was the second coach to take Wright State to the NCAA tournament following the winningest coach in team history, Ralph Underhill. Underhill coached from 1978 to 1996 and accumulated 356 wins at Wright State and an NCAA DII national championship in the 1982–83 season.

Current coaching staff

Seasons
WSU's records season by season during their Division II tenure.

WSU's records season by season since joining Division I in 1987.

Notes

Record vs. Horizon League opponents

Rivalries

Dayton
The Wright State University and University of Dayton series is known as the Gem City Jam. The two universities are located in Dayton, Ohio, only 10 miles apart from each other. Although the two schools no longer compete head to head in men's basketball, they still compete against each other in other sports. The series currently favors Dayton at 5–3. The last meeting was held at the University of Dayton on December 13, 1997, Dayton won 94–63.

Northern Kentucky
The Wright State and Northern Kentucky series began in 1972 where both schools would routinely compete against each other up until 1987 when Wright State moved to division 1. The series would be reignited in 2015 when Northern Kentucky joined the Horizon League. Wright state currently leads the series 27–13.

Other rivals
Although it may not be considered a rivalry, Wright State and Miami (OH) have played a total of 37 times since 1972, with Miami leading the series 21–16. The Raiders and the Redhawks have played each other most seasons since 1999.

All-time statistical leaders

Career leaders

Single-season leaders

Single-game leaders

Postseason

NCAA Division I Tournament history 
Wright State has made four appearances in the NCAA Division I men's basketball tournament, with the Raiders going 1–4.

NCAA Division II tournament results
The Raiders have appeared in the NCAA Division II Tournament eight times. Their combined record is 12–8. They were the 1983 National Champions.

NIT Results
The Raiders have appeared in the National Invitation Tournament (NIT) one time. Their record is 0–1.

CBI results
The Raiders have appeared in one College Basketball Invitational (CBI). Their record is 2–1.

CIT results
The Raiders have appeared in one CollegeInsider.com Postseason Tournament (CIT). Their record is 1–1.

National championships
Wright State has won one national championship (Division II).

Conference championships

Tournament championships
Wright State has four conference tournament championships, most recently in 2022 under coach Scott Nagy. The first championship came in the 1992–93 season under Ralph Underhill. The Raiders have appeared in 8 Horizon League/Midwestern Collegiate championship games, most recently was in 2022. Wright State's first and only appearance in the Mid-Continent Conference championship game resulted in a 94–88 victory over UIC.

Regular season championships

Awards

AP All-Americans
 DaShaun Wood* – 2007

(*) Denotes Honorable Mention

Division II All-Americans

 Bob Grote – 1976
 Rodney Benson – 1981
 Roman Welch – 1981
 Gary Monroe – 1983
 Fred Moore – 1984
 Andy Warner – 1985
 Grant Marion – 1986
 Mark Vest – 1986

Mid-Continent Conference Player of the Year
 Bill Edwards – 1993

Horizon League Player of the Year
 DaShaun Wood – 2007
 Loudon Love – 2020, 2021

Horizon League Coach of the Year

 Paul Biancardi – 2004
 Brad Brownell (co) – 2008
 Billy Donlon – 2013
 Scott Nagy – 2018, 2019, 2020

First-Team All-Mid-Continent Conference

Bill Edwards (1992, 1993)
Mark Woods (1993)
Mike Nahar (1994)

First-Team Horizon League

Vitaly Potapenko (1995, 1996)
Keion Brooks (1997, 1999)
Kevin Melson (2000, 2001)
Israel Sheinfeld (2000)
Seth Doliboa (2003, 2004)
DaShaun Wood (2006, 2007)
Vaughn Duggins (2008, 2011)
Mark Alstork (2017)
Grant Benzinger (2018)
Loudon Love (2019, 2020, 2021)
Tanner Holden (2021, 2022)
Trey Calvin (2023)

Raiders in the NBA
Two Wright State alumni have gone on to play in the NBA. They are:

Bill Edwards – played for the Philadelphia 76ers in 1994
Vitaly Potapenko – drafted 12th overall by the Cleveland Cavaliers in the 1996 NBA draft, played for 11 seasons

Raiders in NBA G League

 Loudon Love – Played for Texas Legends in 2021.

Raiders in international leagues

 Israel Sheinfeld (born 1976) – Israeli basketball player who played in the Israel Basketball Premier League and on the Israeli national basketball team.

References

External links